Revel may refer to:

Brands and enterprises 
 Revel (brand), a French brand from the 1920s 
 Parapluie Revel, a French umbrella from the 1920s
 Revel Atlantic City, a former resort and casino in New Jersey
 Revel Audio, a loudspeaker company owned by Harman International
 Revel Transit, a moped-sharing company

Places 
 Revel, Haute-Garonne, a commune in south-western France
 Revel, Isère, a commune in south-eastern France
 Revel-Tourdan, a commune in the Isère département in south-eastern France
 Reval or sometimes Revel, the historical name of Tallinn, the capital city of Estonia 
 Revello or Revel, Piemont

Other uses
 Revel (album), an album by the Pat McGee Band
 Port Revel, a French maritime pilotage school 
 Revel bun, a saffron bun
 Red River Revel, an annual US festival of food, culture, art, and music

People with the surname
 Bernard Revel (1885–1940), rabbi and the first president of Yeshiva University
 Christophe Revel, French former goalkeeper and now goalkeeping coach
 Gabriel Revel (1643-1712), French painter
 Harry Revel (1905–1958), English composer
 Jean-François Revel (1924–2006), French intellectual, author of Anti-Americanism

People with the given name
 Craig Revel Horwood, Australian-British dancer, choreographer & theatre director

See also 
 Bernard Revel Graduate School of Jewish Studies at Yeshiva University
 Revell, a plastic models manufacturer
 Revels (disambiguation)
 The Revelers, an American quintet